Henri Marie Lebocq was a French Général de Division of World War I. He commanded several regiments during the war and was notable for being the main French commander at the Fighting at Bois-le-Prêtre, leading the 73rd Infantry Division during the engagement. He was also a recipient of the Grand Cross of the Legion of Honour.

Biography
Henri Lebocq was born on December 29, 1861, in Paris within the 7th arrondissement. In 1901, Lebocq was reported as a brevet captain of the 73rd Infantry Regiment.

In 1903 he became battalion commander and was promoted to Colonel in 1913. During the start of World War I, he was given command of the 73rd Infantry Division with a temporary promotion to Général de brigade. On October 1914, he was confirmed to remain as a Général de brigade. On January 17m, 1915, Lebocq lead the 73rd Division at the Bois-le-Prêtre fighting against the 121st Division. Later on May 2 , 1915, he is quoted at the order of the army but was wounded during the Second Battle of Ypres. Lebocq was named Commander of the Legion of Honor on August 1, 1917, and December 20, 1917, he was promoted to Général de division and commanded the 39th Infantry Division with which he paraded in 1919 before President Raymond Poincaré and other politicians during the celebrations of his return from Metz to Paris. Before his retirement, Lebocq was a recipient of the Grand Cross of the Legion of Honour.

Lebocq died on May 10, 1946, at the 16th arrondissement of Paris.

References

Bibliography

1861 births
1946 deaths
French military personnel of World War I
Military personnel from Paris
French generals
Grand Croix of the Légion d'honneur
Grand Officiers of the Légion d'honneur
Commandeurs of the Légion d'honneur
École Spéciale Militaire de Saint-Cyr alumni